Montereale Valcellina is a comune (municipality) in the northeast Italian region Friuli-Venezia Giulia. The comune was formerly part of the Province of Pordenone until its dissolution in 2017.

Montereale Valcellina borders the following municipalities: Andreis, Aviano, Barcis, Maniago, San Quirino.

History 
Montereale was the birthplace (1532) of the miller and philosopher Menocchio, whom the historian Carlo Ginzburg discussed in his now-classic work of microhistory entitled, The Cheese and the Worms: The Cosmos of a Sixteenth-Century Miller, first published in Italian in 1976 and in English in 1980.

Notable people 

 Tommaso Toffoli, professor at Boston University

References

Cities and towns in Friuli-Venezia Giulia